Death in June have an extensive discography, including compilations of older material mixed with (then) newer, singles, limited editions and multiple versions of a single releases.

Albums
The Guilty Have No Pride (6 June 1983)
Burial (15 September 1984)
Nada! (12 October 1985)
The World That Summer (22 July 1986)
Brown Book (30 June 1987)
Östenbräun (1989) - Death in June & Les Joyaux de la Princesse 
The Wall of Sacrifice (March 1989)
But, What Ends When the Symbols Shatter? (25 August 1992)
Rose Clouds of Holocaust (20 May 1995)
Death in June Presents: Occidental Martyr (30 November 1995)
Death in June Presents: KAPO! (6 June 1996)
Scorpion Wind: Heaven Sent (24 July 1996) - Death in June & Boyd Rice (Scorpion Wind)
Take Care & Control (1 January 1998)
Operation Hummingbird (13 June 2000)
All Pigs Must Die (23 November 2001)
Alarm Agents (29 October 2004) - Death in June & Boyd Rice
Free Tibet (3 September 2006) 
The Rule of Thirds (18 March 2008)
Peaceful Snow/Lounge Corps (9 November 2010)
The Snow Bunker Tapes (13 March 2013)
Essence! (30 November 2018)

Singles
"Heaven Street" (1981)
"State Laughter" (1982)
"She Said Destroy" (1984)
"Born Again" (1985)
"Come Before Christ and Murder Love" (1985)
"To Drown a Rose" (1987)
"Paradise Rising" (1992)
"Cathedral of Tears" (1993)
"Sun Dogs" (1994)
"Black Whole of Love" (1995)
"Kameradschaft" (1998)
"Passion! Power!! Purge!!!" (1998)
"We Said Destroy" (2000)
The World That Summer (CD EP) (2008)
"Peaceful Snow" (2010)

Live albums

Compilations

Compilation appearances

Videos

Tributes 

Rock music group discographies